Alticus is a genus of combtooth blennies found in the Pacific and Indian oceans. It is one of 57 genera in the family Blenniidae.

Species
There are currently eight recognized species in this genus:
 Alticus anjouanae (Fourmanoir, 1955)
 Alticus arnoldorum (Curtiss, 1938) (Pacific leaping blenny)
 Alticus kirkii (Günther, 1868) (Kirk's blenny)
 Alticus monochrus Bleeker, 1869
 Alticus montanoi (Sauvage, 1880)
 Alticus saliens (J. R. Forster, 1788) (Leaping blenny)
 Alticus sertatus (Garman, 1903)
 Alticus simplicirrus Smith-Vaniz & V. G. Springer, 1971 (Marquesan rockstripper)

References

External links

 
Salarinae
Articles containing video clips
Taxa named by Bernard Germain de Lacépède
Marine fish genera